2018 Netball Quad Series may refer to:
 2018 Netball Quad Series (January), netball tournament played in the first half of the year
 2018 Netball Quad Series (September), netball tournament played in the second half of the year